Three-Way Split is an extended play (EP) by the indie-rock bands The Juliana Theory, Onelinedrawing and The Grey AM, released on January 10, 2000 on One Day Savior Recordings. The split was originally planned to include New York emo band, Inside, but the band broke up before they could contribute a recording. The split is dedicated to them.

Track listing 
Tracks 1-2 were recorded by The Juliana Theory, track 3 was recorded by Onelinedrawing, while tracks 4-5 were recorded by The Grey AM.
"If I Told You This Was Killing Me, Would You Stop?"
"Variations on a Theme"
"Tricky"
"Sandbox Hopping in Phoenix"
"Fire Breather"

References 

2000 EPs
The Juliana Theory albums
Split EPs